The Northern Football League is an association football league in England.  

Northern Football League may also refer to:

 Northern Football League (Scotland) – defunct association football league in Scotland
 Northern Football League (Australia) – an Australian rules football league
 Northern League (Italy) – defunct association football league in Italy

See also
 NFL (disambiguation)